Robert Lawrence Gernon (July 29, 1943 – March 30, 2005) was a district judge in Kansas 22nd District, from 1979 to 1988, born in Hiawatha, Brown County, Kansas.

He was a 1966 KU B-School major who studied law at Washburn University in Topeka, Kansas graduating in 1969.

Justice Gernon was also trial advocacy instructor at University of Kansas School of Law, a judge on the Kansas Court of Appeals, 1988–2003; and Kansas Supreme Court Justice, 2003–2005.

He also served as a coach, mentor and tutor to Sigma Nu fraternity chapter members in Lawrence, Kansas, and championed the LEAD program, which served as a framework for ongoing Emily Taylor Women's Resource Center (ETWRC) peer mentoring programs.

During 1990, Judge Gernon and Sharon Winslow Gernon were jointly awarded the Kansas University Alumni Association's (KUAA) Mildred Clodfelter Alumni Award for "sustained volunteer service to the University at the local level."

References

External links
Kansas University Women of Distinction (2004)
Kansas Bar Association Professionalism Award (2001)
Law Day: Liberty Bell Award by the Douglas County, Kansas Bar Association
Washburn Law Journal Presentations
The Honorable Robert L. Gernon LL.M. ’01
Kansas Supreme Court justice dies of cancer
KSupreme Court Justice's Legacy Lives On

1943 births
2005 deaths
Kansas state court judges
Kansas Court of Appeals Judges
Justices of the Kansas Supreme Court
Politicians from Lawrence, Kansas
University of Kansas alumni
Washburn University alumni
20th-century American judges
People from Hiawatha, Kansas